is located in the Daisetsuzan Volcanic Group of the Ishikari Mountains, Hokkaidō, Japan. It sits on the western rim of the Ohachidaira caldera.

See also
 List of volcanoes in Japan
 List of mountains in Japan

References
 Geographical Survey Institute

Mamiya